14 Years of Electronic Challenge Vol. II is a various artists compilation album released on September 30, 1997, by COP International.

Reception

Steve Huey of AllMusic notes the presence of "veteran industrial/dance acts." Black Monday said "you may be familiar with these bands, but the songs found here are mostly unknown or rare mixes, showcasing the classic along with the new breed of electronic musicians" and "with this lineup, how could one not be impressed with 14 Years...?" Sonic Boom was negative in their reception of the collection, saying "anyone who has any experience with this music already would have acquired all of the tracks present here years ago" and that it "serves a single purpose, to entice first time listeners to the Electro-Industrial genre."

Track listing

Personnel
Adapted from the 14 Years of Electronic Challenge Vol. II liner notes.

 Markus Becker – compiling
 Jason Graham – photography
 Frank Kaeding – compiling
 Christian Petke (as Count Zero) – compiling, design

Release history

References

External links 
 14 Years of Electronic Challenge Vol. II at Discogs (list of releases)

1997 compilation albums
COP International compilation albums